Jean Bassett Johnson (September 7, 1915 – April 4, 1944) was an American anthropologist and linguist who conducted field studies in Mexico during the 1930s and early 1940s. A doctoral candidate at the University of California, Berkeley, he was a student of Alfred Kroeber and Robert Lowie.

Life and career
Johnson carried out field research among the Chinantec and Mazatec in Oaxaca, the Nahuatl in Jalisco and Colima, and the Yaqui, Varohio, Pima and Opata in Sonora. In July 1938, in Huautla de Jimenez, he and his wife, anthropologist Irmgard Weitlaner-Johnson, along with Bernard Bevan and Louise Lacaud, were some of the first outsiders, in addition to Robert J. Weitlaner (1936), to witness and record a Mazatec healing ceremony where hallucinogenic psilocybin mushrooms (teonanacatl) were consumed. During the course of his research on Mazatec healing practices, Johnson also recorded the use of another hallucinogen, “hierba Maria” now known to be Salvia divinorum. In 1939-1940, under the direction of Morris Swadesh, Johnson conducted a study of the Yaqui language, published posthumously.

Johnson's studies were interrupted by the Second World War. He joined the United States Naval Reserve in 1942 and died in Tunisia in 1944.

Selected works

Articles

Books
 (published posthumously)

References

Further reading

External links
Robert Lowie. "Jean Basset Johnson (1916-1944)", American Anthropologist, Vol 46, No. 4, October-December 1944.

1915 births
1944 deaths
Linguists from the United States
Psychedelic drug researchers
University of California, Berkeley
United States Navy personnel killed in World War II
Linguists of Uto-Aztecan languages
20th-century linguists